The 2017–18 season was Watford's 120th year in their history and third consecutive season in the Premier League. They also participated in the FA Cup and EFL Cup.

The season covered the period from 1 July 2017 to 30 June 2018.

Squad

Current squad

Transfers

Transfers in

Loans in

Transfers out

Loans out

Friendlies
As of 8 July 2017, Watford have announced four pre-season friendlies against AFC Wimbledon, Viktoria Plzeň, Eibar and Real Sociedad.

Competitions

Premier League

League table

Results summary

Results by matchday

Matches
On 14 June 2017, Watford's league season fixtures were announced.

FA Cup
Watford entered the competition in the third round and were handed a home tie against Bristol City.

EFL Cup
Watford entered the EFL Cup in the second round and were drawn at home to Bristol City.

Statistics

Appearances and goals
Last updated on 08 May 2018.

|-
! colspan=14 style=background:#dcdcdc; text-align:center|Goalkeepers

|-
! colspan=14 style=background:#dcdcdc; text-align:center|Defenders

|-
! colspan=14 style=background:#dcdcdc; text-align:center|Midfielders

|-
! colspan=14 style=background:#dcdcdc; text-align:center|Forwards

|-
! colspan=14 style=background:#dcdcdc; text-align:center| Players who have made an appearance or had a squad number this season but have left the club
|-

|}

Cards
Accounts for all competitions. Last updated on 18 December 2017.

Clean sheets
Last updated on 18 December 2017.

References

Watford
Watford F.C. seasons